Sergei Ivanov (born 1953), former Head of Kremlin Chief of Staff

Sergey Ivanov may also refer to:
Sergey Ivanov (American football) (born 1985), American footballer
Sergey Ivanov (painter) (1864–1910), Russian painter
Sergei Ivanov (cyclist) (born 1975), Russian professional bicycle racer
Sergei Ivanov (footballer, born 1964), Russian football player and referee
Sergei Ivanov (footballer, born 1980), Kyrgyzstan footballer with FC Irtysh (as of 2008)
Sergey Ivanov (footballer, born 1984), Russian footballer formerly with FC Zenit St. Petersburg and FC Alania Vladikavkaz
Sergei Ivanov (footballer, born 1997), Russian footballer
Sergey Ivanov (referee) (born 1984), Russian international football referee
Sergey Ivanov (runner) (born 1979), Russian runner
Sergey Ivanov (politician, born 1969), Russian politician, a deputy of the 4th, 5th, 6th and 7th State Duma
Sergey Ivanov (Saint Petersburg politician), Russian politician
Sergei Ivanov (Estonian politician) (born 1958), Estonian politician
Sergei Ivanov (mathematician) (born 1972), Russian mathematician
Sergey Ivanov (chess player), Russian chess grandmaster, see Leningrad City Chess Championship